Interleukins (ILs) are a group of cytokines (secreted proteins and signal molecules) that are expressed and secreted by white blood cells (leukocytes) as well as some other body cells. The human genome encodes more than 50 interleukins and related proteins.

The function of the immune system primarily depends on interleukins, and rare deficiencies of a number of them have been described, all featuring autoimmune diseases or immune deficiency. The majority of interleukins are synthesized by CD4 helper T-lymphocytes, as well as through monocytes, macrophages, and endothelial cells. They promote the development and differentiation of T and B lymphocytes, and hematopoietic cells.

Interleukin receptors on astrocytes in the hippocampus are also known to be involved in the development of spatial memories in mice.

History and name 

The name "interleukin" was chosen in 1979, to replace the various different names used by different research groups to designate interleukin 1 (lymphocyte activating factor, mitogenic protein, T-cell replacing factor III, B-cell activating factor, B-cell differentiation factor, and "Heidikine") and interleukin 2 (TSF, etc.). This decision was taken during the Second International Lymphokine Workshop in Switzerland (27-31 May 1979 in Ermatingen).

The term interleukin derives from (inter-) "as a means of communication", and (-leukin) "deriving from the fact that many of these proteins are produced by leukocytes and act on leukocytes". The name is something of a relic; it has since been found that interleukins are produced by a wide variety of body cells. The term was coined by Dr Vern Paetkau, University of Victoria.

Some interleukins are classified as lymphokines, lymphocyte-produced cytokines that mediate immune responses.

Common families

Interleukin 1

Interleukin 1 alpha and interleukin 1 beta (IL1 alpha and IL1 beta) are cytokines that participate in the regulation of immune responses, inflammatory reactions, and hematopoiesis. Two types of IL-1 receptor, each with three extracellular immunoglobulin (Ig)-like domains, limited sequence similarity (28%) and different pharmacological characteristics have been cloned from mouse and human cell lines: these have been termed type I and type II receptors. The receptors both exist in transmembrane (TM) and soluble forms: the soluble IL-1 receptor is thought to be post-translationally derived from cleavage of the extracellular portion of the membrane receptors.

Both IL-1 receptors (CD121a/IL1R1, CD121b/IL1R2) appear to be well conserved in evolution, and map to the same chromosomal location. The receptors can both bind all three forms of IL-1 (IL-1 alpha, IL-1 beta and IL-1 receptor antagonist).

The crystal structures of IL1A and IL1B have been solved, showing them to share the same 12-stranded beta-sheet structure as both the heparin binding growth factors and the Kunitz-type soybean trypsin inhibitors. The beta-sheets are arranged in 4 similar lobes around a central axis, 8 strands forming an anti-parallel beta-barrel. Several regions, especially the loop between strands 4 and 5, have been implicated in receptor binding.

Molecular cloning of the Interleukin 1 Beta converting enzyme is generated by the proteolytic cleavage of an inactive precursor molecule. A complementary DNA encoding protease that carries out this cleavage has been cloned. Recombinant expression enables cells to process precursor Interleukin 1 Beta to the mature form of the enzyme.

Interleukin 1 also plays a role in the central nervous system. Research indicates that mice with a genetic deletion of the type I IL-1 receptor display markedly impaired hippocampal-dependent memory functioning and long-term potentiation, although memories that do not depend on the integrity of the hippocampus seem to be spared.  However, when mice with this genetic deletion have wild-type neural precursor cells  injected into their hippocampus and these cells are allowed to mature into astrocytes containing the interleukin-1 receptors, the mice exhibit normal hippocampal-dependent memory function, and partial restoration of long-term potentiation.

Interleukin 2

T lymphocytes regulate the growth and differentiation of T cells and certain B cells through the release of secreted protein factors. These factors, which include interleukin 2 (IL2), are secreted by lectin- or antigen-stimulated T cells, and have various physiological effects. IL2 is a lymphokine that induces the proliferation of responsive T cells. In addition, it acts on some B cells, via receptor-specific binding, as a growth factor and antibody production stimulant. The protein is secreted as a single glycosylated polypeptide, and cleavage of a signal sequence is required for its activity. Solution NMR suggests that the structure of IL2 comprises a bundle of 4 helices (termed A-D), flanked by 2 shorter helices and several poorly defined loops. Residues in helix A, and in the loop region between helices A and B, are important for receptor binding. Secondary structure analysis has suggested similarity to IL4 and granulocyte-macrophage colony stimulating factor (GMCSF).

Interleukin 3

Interleukin 3 (IL3) is a cytokine that regulates hematopoiesis by controlling the production, differentiation and function of granulocytes and macrophages. The protein, which exists in vivo as a monomer, is produced in activated T cells and mast cells, and is activated by the cleavage of an N-terminal signal sequence.

IL3 is produced by T lymphocytes and T-cell lymphomas only after stimulation with antigens, mitogens, or chemical activators such as phorbol esters. However, IL3 is constitutively expressed in the myelomonocytic leukaemia cell line WEHI-3B. It is thought that the genetic change of the cell line to constitutive production of IL3 is the key event in development of this leukaemia.

Interleukin 4
Interleukin 4 (IL4) is produced by CD4+ T cells specialized in providing help to B cells to proliferate and to undergo class switch recombination and somatic hypermutation. Th2 cells, through production of IL-4, have an important function in B-cell responses that involve class switch recombination to the IgG1 and IgE isotypes.

Interleukin 5
Interleukin 5 (IL5), also known as eosinophil differentiation factor (EDF), is a lineage-specific cytokine for eosinophilpoiesis. It regulates eosinophil growth and activation, and thus plays an important role in diseases associated with increased levels of eosinophils, including asthma. IL5 has a similar overall fold to other cytokines (e.g., IL2, IL4 and GCSF), but while these exist as monomeric structures, IL5 is a homodimer. The fold contains an anti-parallel 4-alpha-helix bundle with a left handed twist, connected by a 2-stranded anti-parallel beta-sheet. The monomers are held together by 2 interchain disulphide bonds.

Interleukin 6

Interleukin 6 (IL6), also referred to as B-cell stimulatory factor-2 (BSF-2) and interferon beta-2, is a cytokine involved in a wide variety of biological functions. It plays an essential role in the final differentiation of B cells into immunoglobulin-secreting cells, as well as inducing myeloma/plasmacytoma growth, nerve cell differentiation, and, in hepatocytes, acute-phase reactants.

A number of other cytokines may be grouped with IL6 on the basis of sequence similarity. These include granulocyte colony-stimulating factor (GCSF) and myelomonocytic growth factor (MGF). GCSF acts in hematopoiesis by affecting the production, differentiation, and function of 2 related white cell groups in the blood. MGF also acts in hematopoiesis, stimulating proliferation and colony formation of normal and transformed avian cells of the myeloid lineage.

Cytokines of the IL6/GCSF/MGF family are glycoproteins of about 170 to 180 amino acid residues that contain four conserved cysteine residues involved in two disulphide bonds. They have a compact, globular fold (similar to other interleukins), stabilised by the two disulphide bonds. One half of the structure is dominated by a 4-alpha-helix bundle with a left-handed twist; the helices are anti-parallel, with two overhand connections, which fall into a double-stranded anti-parallel beta-sheet. The fourth alpha-helix is important to the biological activity of the molecule.

Interleukin 7 

Interleukin 7 (IL-7) is a cytokine that serves as a growth factor for early lymphoid cells of both B- and T-cell lineages.

Interleukin 8

Interleukin 8 is a chemokine produced by macrophages and other cell types such as epithelial cells, airway smooth muscle cells and endothelial cells.  Endothelial cells store IL-8 in their storage vesicles, the Weibel-Palade bodies.  In humans, the interleukin-8 protein is encoded by the CXCL8 gene. IL-8 is  initially produced as a precursor peptide of 99 amino acids which then undergoes cleavage to create several active IL-8 isoforms. In culture, a 72 amino acid peptide is the major form secreted by macrophages.

There are many receptors on the surface membrane capable of binding IL-8; the most frequently studied types are the G protein-coupled serpentine receptors CXCR1 and CXCR2. Expression and affinity for IL-8 differs between the two receptors (CXCR1 > CXCR2). Through a chain of biochemical reactions, IL-8 is secreted and is an important mediator of the immune reaction in the innate immune system response.

Interleukin 9 

Interleukin 9 (IL-9) is a cytokine that supports IL-2 independent and IL-4 independent growth of helper T cells. Early studies had indicated that Interleukin 9 and 7 seem to be evolutionary related  and Pfam, InterPro and PROSITE entries exist for interleukin 7/interleukin 9 family. However, a recent  study  has shown that IL-9 is, in fact, much closer to both IL-2 and IL-15, than to IL-7.  Moreover, the study showed irreconcilable structural differences between IL-7 and all the remaining cytokines signalling through the γc receptor ( IL-2, IL-4, IL-7, IL-9, IL-15 and IL-21).

Interleukin 10
Interleukin 10 (IL-10) is a protein that inhibits the synthesis of a number of cytokines, including IFN-gamma, IL-2, IL-3, TNF, and GM-CSF produced by activated macrophages and by helper T cells. In structure, IL-10 is a protein of about 160 amino acids that contains four conserved cysteines involved in disulphide bonds. IL-10 is highly similar to the Human herpesvirus 4 (Epstein-Barr virus) BCRF1 protein, which inhibits the synthesis of gamma-interferon and to Equid herpesvirus 2 (Equine herpesvirus 2) protein E7. It is also similar, but to a lesser degree, with human protein mda-7. a protein that has antiproliferative properties in human melanoma cells. Mda-7 contains only two of the four cysteines of IL-10.

Interleukin 11
Interleukin 11 (IL-11) is a secreted protein that stimulates megakaryocytopoiesis, initially thought to lead to an increased production of platelets (it has since been shown to be redundant to normal platelet formation), as well as activating osteoclasts, inhibiting epithelial cell proliferation and apoptosis, and inhibiting macrophage mediator production. These functions may be particularly important in mediating the hematopoietic, osseous and mucosal protective effects of interleukin 11.

Interleukin 12

Interleukin 12 (IL-12) is a disulphide-bonded heterodimer consisting of a 35kDa alpha subunit and a 40kDa beta subunit. It is involved in the stimulation and maintenance of Th1 cellular immune responses, including the normal host defence against various intracellular pathogens, such as Leishmania, Toxoplasma, Measles virus, and Human immunodeficiency virus 1 (HIV). IL-12 also has an important role in enhancing the cytotoxic function of NK cells and role in pathological Th1 responses, such as in inflammatory bowel disease and multiple sclerosis. Suppression of IL-12 activity in such diseases may have therapeutic benefit. On the other hand, administration of recombinant IL-12 may have therapeutic benefit in conditions associated with pathological Th2 responses.

Interleukin 13

Interleukin 13 (IL-13) is a pleiotropic cytokine that may be important in the regulation of the inflammatory and immune responses. It inhibits inflammatory cytokine production and synergises with IL-2 in regulating interferon-gamma synthesis. The sequences of IL-4 and IL-13 are distantly related.

Interleukin 15

Interleukin 15 (IL-15) is a cytokine that possesses a variety of biological functions, including stimulation and maintenance of cellular immune responses. IL-15 stimulates the proliferation of T lymphocytes, which requires interaction of IL-15 with IL-15R alpha and components of IL-2R, including IL-2R beta and IL-2R gamma (common gamma chain,  γc), but not IL-2R alpha.

Interleukin 17

Interleukin 17 (IL-17) is a potent proinflammatory cytokine produced by activated memory T cells. This cytokine is characterized by its proinflammatory properties, role in recruiting neutrophils, and importance in innate and adaptive immunity. Not only does IL-17 play a key role in inflammation of many autoimmune diseases, such as RA, allergies, asthma, psoriasis, and more, but it also plays a key role in the pathogenesis of these diseases. Additionally, some studies have found that IL-17 plays a role in tumorigenesis (initial formation of a tumor) and transplant rejection. The IL-17 family is thought to represent a distinct signaling system that appears to have been highly conserved across vertebrate evolution.

In humans

International nonproprietary names for analogues and derivatives

References

External links

Cytokines & Cells Online Pathfinder Encyclopedia

Cytokines